Liangzihu District is a district of the city of Ezhou, Hubei, People's Republic of China.

The district is named after the Liangzi Lake (Liangzihu), eastern part of which is located within the district. On January 1, 2018, Ezhou  officially implemented a new law called "Liangzihu District Marine Life Protection Zone Absolute Fishing Ban Work Implementation Plan".

Geography

Administrative Divisions
Liangzihu District has five towns:

References

County-level divisions of Hubei
Ezhou